Nová Paka is a town in Jičín District in the Hradec Králové Region of the Czech Republic. It has about 8,900 inhabitants.

Administrative parts
Villages of Heřmanice, Kumburský Újezd, Podlevín, Přibyslav, Pustá Proseč, Radkyně, Štikov, Studénka, Valdov, Vlkov, Vrchovina and Zlámaniny are administrative parts of Nová Paka.

Geography
It lies in a hilly landscape of the Giant Mountains Foothills.

History
The first written mention of Nová Paka is from 1357 with regard to the installation of new vicar to the Church of Saint Nicholas. During these times the town was called Mladá Paka ("Young Paka").

In 1563, the almost entire town was destroyed by fire. In 1586, the plague killed approximately half of the citizens. Another 450 people died of plague in 1625. In 1643, during the Thirty Years' War, the town was pillaged by the Swedish army. A fire in 1666 destroyed the northern part on the town square.

Demographics

Economy
In Nová Paka there is the Nová Paka Brewery.

Sights

The Church of Saint Nicholas was first mentioned in 1357 and rebuilt in the Neo-Gothic style in 1872. The Marian Holy Trinity column is from 1716 and is the oldest statue in the town. On the square there is a fountain from 1814 and monument to Jan Hus from 1898.

Thanks to the legend of finding a miraculous statue of the Virgin Mary, the Minim monastery was established in the second half of the 17th century. The Church of the Assumption of the Virgin Mary was built in 1709–1724 and made Nová Paka a pilgrimage site. After the religious reform of Joseph II, the monastery was closed in 1785. From 1872, the premises served as a hospital. Today it houses social services.

Cemetery Chapel of Our Lady of Sorrows comes from 1700–1709. The wooden Greek Catholic Church of the Transfiguration of Jesus and Saint Nicholas was transferred from Carpathian Ruthenia in 1930. 

Sucharda's House is a Neorenaissance house from 1895–1896. It belonged to the Sucharda family, from which many notable sculptors, woodcarvers and painters came. Nowadays there is a historic exposition and a gallery of artists from the region.

Notable people
Stanislav Sucharda (1866–1916), sculptor and professor of arts
Anna Boudová Suchardová (1870–1940), artist
Bohumil Kafka (1878–1942), sculptor
Vojtěch Sucharda (1884–1968), sculptor, woodcarver and puppeteer
Ladislav Zívr (1909–1980), sculptor
Miroslav Hák (1911–1978), photographer
Naďa Urbánková (1939–2023), singer and actress
Jiří Horáček (born 1945), theoretical physicist

References

External links

Cities and towns in the Czech Republic
Populated places in Jičín District